A wiki hosting service, or wiki farm, is a server or an array of servers that offers users tools to simplify the creation and development of individual, independent wikis. Wiki farms are not to be confused with wiki "families", a more generic term for any group of wikis located on the same server.

Prior to wiki farms, someone who wanted to operate a wiki had to install the software and manage the server(s) themselves. With a wiki farm, the farm's administration installs the core wiki code once on its own servers, centrally maintains the servers, and establishes unique space on the servers for the content of each individual wiki with the shared core code executing the functions of each wiki.

Both commercial and non-commercial wiki farms are available for users and online communities. While most of the wiki farms allow anyone to open their own wiki, some impose restrictions. Many wiki farm companies generate revenue through the insertion of advertisements, but often allow payment of a monthly fee as an alternative to accepting ads.

See also 
 Comparison of wiki hosting services

References

External links 
 Computers/Software/Groupware/Wiki/Wiki Farms at Curlie
 Wikimatrix, with interactive selection of wikifarms based on user preference, now only available through the Wayback Machine.

 
Web hosting